Vakil Babu is a Hindi movie, which was released in 1982. The movie was produced by Jawahar Kapoor and P. K. Luthra and directed by Asit Sen. The film stars Raj Kapoor alongside his younger brother Shashi Kapoor and also features Zeenat Aman, Rakesh Roshan, Kader Khan, Aruna Irani and Kishore Sahu. This was Raj Kapoor's last leading film role and was also the first and only time he appeared onscreen with his brother Shashi, not counting Awara, wherein Shashi Kapoor appeared as a child actor.

Plot
Famous sculptor Shekhar Kumar gets wrongly accused for the murder of Prem Oberoi, a man who was lustful towards his wife Kalpana. Judge Rajvansh hires an ordinary advocate, Satyaprakash Mathur, as defence lawyer for Shekhar. Mathur investigates the case and finds out that Steward Suresh Talwar had actually murdered Prem on finding out that Prem was previously in a relationship with Suresh's fiance, Shanti. Later he also murdered Shanti as she had witnessed his crime. At last, Shekhar is acquitted of all charges.

Cast
 Raj Kapoor as Advocate Satyaprakash Mathur 
 Shashi Kapoor as Shekhar Kumar
 Zeenat Aman as Kalpana Chaudhary
 Rakesh Roshan as Prem Oberoi
 Rehman as Public Prosecutor Khan
 Kishore Sahu as Judge Rajvansh
 Agha as Shekhar's Assistant
 Jalal Agha as Anil Kumar Shrivastav
 Anju Mahendru as Shanti
 Aruna Irani as Munni Bai
 Kader Khan as Man at Court House
 Pinchoo Kapoor as Captain Chaudhary

Music
The music for this film was composed by Laxmikant-Pyarelal and penned by Anand Bakshi.

References

External links

1982 films
1980s Hindi-language films
Films scored by Laxmikant–Pyarelal